Buddy Earl Justus (December 25, 1952 – December 13, 1990) was an American spree killer who raped and murdered three women, including a pregnant woman, across Georgia, Florida, and Virginia in October 1978. Convicted of all three murders and receiving deaths sentences in all three states, Justus was executed in Virginia in 1990.

Early life 
Justus was born in Niagara Falls, New York on Christmas Day, 1952. He came from an abusive family, and eventually ended up in a Virginia orphanage.

Murders 
On October 3, 1978, Justus broke into the Ironto, Virginia trailer of Ida Mae Moses, 21, and proceeded to rape and murder her. Moses, a nurse, had been set to give birth in two weeks and had already planned a name for her unborn son.

Justus moved south, picking up an 18-year-old hitchhiker, Dale Goins, along the way. They kidnapped, raped, and murdered Rosemary Jackson, a 32-year-old housewife, while she was leaving a store in Atlanta. Days later, in Florida, Justus and Goins kidnapped, raped, and murdered, Stephanie Hawkins, who had been preparing for her son's birthday party.

Trial and execution 
Justus was arrested on October 11, 1978, in Grundy, Virginia. He and Goins were tried for each of the three murders they had committed. Justus was convicted of killing Moses, Jackson, and Hawkins, receiving a death sentence for each murder. Goins was convicted of murdering Jackson and Hawkins, receiving life sentences in Georgia and Florida, which he is still serving. In 1983, Justus said he was planning to waive his appeals, but then changed his mind.

After his appeals failed, Justus was executed in the electric chair at the Virginia State Penitentiary on December 13, 1990. Justus had no last words, but gave an interview earlier that day. In a morning interview with WFIR, Justus said "I want it to be over with, not for me, but for the victims' families. I'm ready to go to a better place. I want it to be put to rest. I've asked for forgiveness to a lot of people and I was able to forgive myself." Justus also admonished capital punishment, calling it "barbaric". "Let me be the last person," he said. "There is a better way to deal with crimes than taking people's lives." His last meal consisted of sirloin steak, french fries, tossed salad, strawberry pie and tea. Justus was the last man executed at the Virginia State Penitentiary. All subsequent executions in Virginia were carried out at Greensville Correctional Center.

See also 
 Capital punishment in Virginia
 List of people executed in Virginia

References 

1952 births
1990 deaths
American rapists
American spree killers
American people convicted of rape
American people executed for murder
People convicted of murder by Florida
People convicted of murder by Georgia (U.S. state)
People convicted of murder by Virginia
People executed by Virginia by electric chair
20th-century American criminals
20th-century executions by Virginia
Executed spree killers
People from Niagara Falls, New York